Molecular Oncology is a monthly peer-reviewed open-access medical journal covering research in molecular oncology. It is published by Wiley on behalf of the Federation of European Biochemical Societies. The journal regularly publishes thematic issues with review articles focusing on specific topics of basic, translational, or clinical cancer research. According to the Journal Citation Reports, the journal has a 2021 impact factor of 7.449.

References

External links

Oncology journals
English-language journals
Wiley (publisher) academic journals
Bimonthly journals
Publications established in 2007
Creative Commons Attribution-licensed journals